is a Japanese anime original video animation (OVA) series and a spin-off to the main Code Geass series. It was created by Sunrise and directed by Kazuki Akane. The story is set in Europe during the Britannian invasion of the continent between Lelouch of the Rebellions two seasons, focused pretty much on the young soldier Akito Hyuga from the European Army alongside his superior Leila Malcal, both victims of a power known as Geass.

The five episode OVA originated from Sunrise's desire to produce a new work related to the franchise with Akane taking the director role despite his inexperience with it. Akane has cited both the Roman Empire and the 2011 earthquake as influences for the OVA's darker narrative. It was written by Hiroshi Ōnogi with music composed by Ichiko Hashimoto. In North America the series was released by Funimation and in Australia by Madman Entertainment.

Despite the OVA being commercially successful, critics have provided both positive and negative comments. Praise was given to the OVA's character-driven scenarios for how they handle the duo of Akito and Leila as both gradually develop their characters while bonding during war.

Plot
After Operation Marva, the young soldier Akito Hyuga remains as the single survivor  using his skills as a mecha pilot, better known as Knightframe. He befriends Lieutenant Colonel Leila Malcal at a party. The two stop a terrorist attack perpetrated by trio of Japanese soldiers, who wanted to kidnap Europa United General Gene Smilas. In exchange for sparing their lives, Leila has terrorists Ryo Sayama, Ayano Kosaka and Yukiya Naruse join her Wyvern Squad.

After quelling distrust with her new recruits, Leila leads the team in a mission with the E.U. Army to push back the invading Britannian army. Akito, Ryo, Yukiya and Ayano become berserker and easily destroy most of their enemies from the Knights of St. Michael's Ashra squad. Shin Hyuga appears and reveals that he has been brainwashing him using Geass to manipulate him. Shin tries to make Akito commit suicide through the Geass but he is stopped by Ryo. The Britannian forces escape. The Britannian forces then receive aid from the knight Suzaku Kururugi who is escorting the strategist Julius Kingsley. The Wyvern Squad are stranded with no way home and no money. The group starts living with the Romani women who originally aimed to con them. During their stay, Akito and Leila bond upon telling each other's past. Julius starts plotting the conquest of the European Army with Shin's aid. However, Julius remembers his true identity as the rebellious prince Lelouch Vi Britannia,  son of the current Emperor. This causes Suzaku to turn against Shin.

The Wyverns board the leading Ark Fleet ship and sink it. In the mission, Akito succumbs to Shin's Geass, and nearly kills Ashley. Shortly afterwards, the Wyvern Squad appears to have all died in battle. Leila sets defensive measures in place to stop Shin from infiltrating the base. Shin starts having memories of his last relatives, who encourage him to commit suicide, but is stopped by Jean Rowe. Shin and the Holy Order of Michael discover the location of Castle Weisswolf and arrived to lay siege to it. However, Klaus Warwick contacted them for a formal surrender with the condition of sparing the lives of the inhabitants. Shin later reveals his true agenda to Leila: he wants to cause open war between the 3 superpowers by nuking Pendragon with wZERO's Apollos' Chariot missiles in order to kill the emperor. The Wyverns then appear, with Akito taking Leila from Shin while Yukiya destroys the Ark.

Ashley joins the Wyverns after being betrayed by Shin and urges Jean to take his side based on their leader's recent descent into madness. The remaining forces of the Knights of St. Michael assemble to launch a final assault on Castle Weisswolf against the W-0, along with their new ally Ashley. Although the Wyverns take down most of their forces, Shin remains superior. Leila then awakes her Geass which causes the late people to confront Shin. The fight continues as Akito's and Shin's Knightframes are damaged and start fighting with swords. As Shin is about to kill his brother, Jean intervenes and shoots him while being impaled by the man she loves. Shin drops his hatred and succumbs to his wounds next to Jean's body. The European Army becomes a republic and the Wyvern Squad retires. As Akito and Leila start a relationship, a young man named Rolo rescues Suzaku and Lelouch from the Euro Britannnian prison.

Production

Sunrise producer Kawaguchi Yoshitaka asked Kazuki Akane to produce the OVAs when he was working on the retakes of the Birdy the Mighty: Decode 02 in 2009. Though had heard of the title, Akane watched none of it. He remembers watching the first two episodes and was surprised with the involvement of the mangaka group Clamp as character designers. He was amazed that they were drawing such intense characters with their personal touch and all for a TV series. Furthermore, he felt they drew all of the mechanical action so well by hand. Kawaguchi who came to him and proposed the OVA concept. Back when he was at Sunrise quite a long time ago, Kawaguchi and him worked a together with his working on production progress and his working on staging. Despite Akane not feeling fitting for such project, Kawaguchi claimed he needed a new staff member due to Goro Tanaguchi not being available. His impression was that it was a production packed with elements that the viewers wanted to see providing plenty of twists and turns. The producers also gave me their suggestion, so at that point he thought he would consider Europe and the E.U. Akane was absorbed in the history of the Roman Empire which led to a similar experience in the writing of the OVA. Due to Code Geass fame within the fandom, Akane expressed pressure when making the second OVA, aiming to give the audience a present through it. The narrative was conceived bby the director to give the series a darker tone than the television series inspired by the recent 2011 Tōhoku earthquake and tsunami. In order to produce more original concepts, Akane made the story to focus on Europe to contrast the setting from the previous series.

Akito the Exiled was directed by Akane who claims it took five years to develop the Code Geass spin-off. Since Code Geass had its own source material, Akane does not regard the OVAs to be material that he completely created which left to his desire to create his own work in the next years, Stars Align. In contrast to the original Code Geass: Lelouch of the Rebellion that used handdrawn animation, the OVAs use 3D animation for the mechas' fights, an idea proposed by the producer. Akane originally had doubts in regards to this decision, fearing a possible reject from the staff, he was instead glad that the idea approved in order to bring more innovative elements to the franchise. While still claiming that the animation should be handrawn, Akane added that humans should still be made through regular work. The CG director was Sato Gochu. They gave distinguishable characters to each machine to give the impression that it was the characters who are actually operating the machines. The backgrounds were created using CG as well and helped making the action scenes more exiting. Modeler Kana Kojima compared the art boards of Gallia Grande and Castle Weiss-Wolf with the completed CG and explained how he added color, taints, shades, depth, and light reflection. The animation was in general challging to do in retrospective.

Takahiro Kimura returned for character designs and Akira Yasuda returns to do the Knightmare designs. The first OVA was first screened in cinemas in an unknown time. The visual aspect of that was large for Akane. Clamp drew a character for him, and when he saw it he was pleased. The team then began to create concurrent mechanical action using Orange and 3D computer graphics, and once they had a Knightmare Frame movie piece put together and as Akane saw it and enjoyed it. Among multiple bulky character, the brainwashed Lelouch stands out as a thin person called "ku" who Kimura drawn to give sex appeal. Kimura also wanted the Wyvern Squard to have a Romani-like uniformed feel to it, but failed to give such style.

Release

The new Code Geass series was first revealed on December 5, 2009. In Japan, the series was released in a total of four home media releases and a Blu-ray box on January 29, 2019. Along with the two seasons of the television series, the OVAs are licensed by Funimation. It was also screened in Otakon 2016. In January 2016, Manga Entertainment, who licensed the series in the UK, listed that they would release the first two episodes on Blu-Ray with an English dub on December 5, 2016. They later changed the date to April 10, 2017, and as of most recently the release is now scheduled to be on October 1, 2017. Originally intended to be released in four chapters, production of a fifth Akito the Exiled episode was announced after the Japanese debut of the third entry on May 2, 2015.Madman Entertainment has also released the first three episodes on DVD. Funimation announced that they would release the series in early 2017. On March 15, 2017, Funimation officially announced the pre-order and release date, June 27, 2017. The release will be a Blu-ray and DVD Combo pack with both subbed and dubbed audio. The picture drama has been released in only Japan and Italy. Ukyō Kodachi wrote a novelization of the OVA published by Kadokawa Shoten.

Reception
The first episode earned US$447,630 on 30 screens for a per-screen total of US$14,921. Next episodes also were screened and appeared in the box office but without numbers, while homemedia releases also sold well.

ImpulseGamer praised the first episode for the handling of the pacing but feared that Akito might come across as a brooding archetype based on his quite personality which contrasts his insanity when fighting; The fight scenes were received positively from ImpulseGamer. Kotaku commented on the series' narrative positively, commenting on the philosophy that Akito suffers in regards to wanting to die which is rivaled by how Leila instead wants him to embrace the concept of living, an ideal that was briefly explored Lelouch of the Rebellion through Suzaku's being ordered to live. Meanwhile, Leila was compared with Lelouch, seeing the heroine as her counterpart for rejecting the idea of becoming a criminal or obtaining life in contrast to Lelouch's life across the television series and his resurrection. In conclusion, they felt that the series' narrative made the franchise more complex for dealing more with the grey morality. Despite the character's nature and dark narrative, Sumikai enjoyed the Wyverns' rest as it helps to see a calmer side of themselves most notably the loner Akito or the rebellious Ashley. The Fandom Post agreed but still found the characters enjoyable as well as the handling of the pacing and how complex is Akito when seen properly. Besides Akito's past and how it is portrayed in the story, The Fandom Post found his growing relationship with Leila as one of the OVA's strongest point to the point Leila often feels as a more central character.

Otaku USA felt the series' beginning to be nihilist for the handling of Shin Hyuga as the main villain but felt latter episodes were more entertaining for developing his brother but at the same time in a too simplistic way despite the franchise's fame for focusing on politics. Anime News Network was more critical to the OVA, finding it to lack the appeal of the original series due to the different staff working on it, mostly due to Akane's works in general. Despite criticizing the character focused scenes on Akito, Anime News Network enjoyed the handling of latter scenes, due to how properly he is developed. As a result, the reviewer found that Akito the Exiled is more striking on its own rather than as a Code Geass spin-off.

For the finale, Japaniac praised the fight scenes, most notably the one between the two Hyuga brothers. Besides their fight, the reviewer was amazed by how the staff focuses on their past and how was their relationship. Another relationship found appealing by the site was the one of Akito and Leila due to how they become connected by the power of Geass and develop a romantic bond. Although he found the ending appealing, Japaniac commented that there were still some parts from the narrative left to be explored and that the inclusion of Lelouch and Suzaku in the ending could only be understood by returning fans. Kotaku criticized the handling of the mechas' animation for being too different from the Knightmares from the television series. Japaniac still enjoyed the coreography given to the Knightmare fights. Sumikai enjoyed the fights but at the same time felt that they were overshadowed by how the soldiers use tactics rather than direct combat to take the advantage. Anime News Network also criticized the English dub of most of the European characters as they use a poor accent when talking as well as the use of CGI.

Notes

References

External links
 

2012 anime OVAs
2013 Japanese novels
Akito the Exiled
Discrimination in fiction
Fiction about curses
Fiction about mind control
Funimation
Light novels
Mecha anime and manga
Military anime and manga